The Chicago Limited was the name of several named passenger trains in the United States:
the Chicago Limited (C&NW train), operated by the Chicago and North Western Transportation Company between Chicago and Duluth, Minnesota
the Chicago Limited (DLW train), operated by the Delaware, Lackawanna and Western Railroad between Hoboken, New Jersey and Chicago
the Chicago Limited (IC train), operated by the Illinois Central Railroad between Chicago and New Orleans, Louisiana
the Chicago Limited (Monon train), operated by the Monon Railroad between Chicago and Indianapolis, Indiana
the Chicago Limited (PRR train), operated by the Pennsylvania Railroad between Chicago and New York City
the Chicago Limited (PM train), operated by the Pere Marquette Railway between Chicago and Grand Rapids, Michigan